Stanisław Łukaszczyk (born 13 July 1944) is a Polish biathlete. He competed in the 20 km individual event at the 1968 Winter Olympics.

References

1944 births
Living people
Polish male biathletes
Olympic biathletes of Poland
Biathletes at the 1968 Winter Olympics
People from Tatra County